Ketocaine (INN) (brand name Vericaina, former developmental code name Astra 2358 or A-2358) is an amino ether local anesthetic of the butyrophenone family used topically for pain relief. It is marketed in Italy.

Synthesis

Williamson ether synthesis between 2'-hydroxybutyrophenone [2887-61-8] (1) and diisopropylaminoethyl chloride hydrochloride [4261-68-1] (2) gives Ketocaine (3)..

References

Phenol ethers
Aromatic ketones
Local anesthetics
Sodium channel blockers
Diisopropylamino compounds